This is a list of 174 species in Hemerodromia, a genus of dance flies in the family Empididae.

Hemerodromia species

 Hemerodromia acuminata Collin, 1941 c g
 Hemerodromia acutata Grootaert, Yang & Saigusa, 2000 c g
 Hemerodromia adulatoria Collin, 1927 c g
 Hemerodromia albicornis Meigen, 1822 c g
 Hemerodromia alida Smith, 1969 c g
 Hemerodromia alphalutea  g
 Hemerodromia amazonensis  g
 Hemerodromia anisoserrata  g
 Hemerodromia anomala  g
 Hemerodromia apicalis Smith, 1969 c g
 Hemerodromia apiciserrata Grootaert, Yang & Saigusa, 2000 c g
 Hemerodromia attenuata  g
 Hemerodromia baetica Collin, 1927 c g
 Hemerodromia basalis Smith, 1969 c g
 Hemerodromia beatica Collin, 1927 g
 Hemerodromia beijingensis Yang & Yang, 1988 c g
 Hemerodromia betalutea  g
 Hemerodromia bethiana Vaillant & Gagneur, 1998 c g
 Hemerodromia bifurcata Collin, 1941 c g
 Hemerodromia brevicercata  g
 Hemerodromia brevifrons Melander, 1947 i c g
 Hemerodromia breviradia  g
 Hemerodromia brunnea Melander, 1927 i c g
 Hemerodromia burdicki MacDonald, 1998 c g
 Hemerodromia captus Coquillett, 1895 i c g
 Hemerodromia carioca  g
 Hemerodromia cataluna Strobl, 1909 c g
 Hemerodromia cercusdilatata  g
 Hemerodromia chelata MacDonald, 1998 c g
 Hemerodromia chillcotti Harper, 1974 i c g
 Hemerodromia chita Smith, 1965 c g
 Hemerodromia chitaoides Wagner, Leese & Panesar, 2004 c g
 Hemerodromia choulyana Vaillant & Gagneur, 1998 c g
 Hemerodromia claripennis Frey, 1958 c g
 Hemerodromia coleophora Melander, 1927 i c g
 Hemerodromia collini  g
 Hemerodromia concava Yang & Yang, 1988 c g
 Hemerodromia concinna Smith, 1969 c g
 Hemerodromia conspecta  g
 Hemerodromia cornuhypandrialis  g
 Hemerodromia cummingi  g
 Hemerodromia curvata Grootaert, Yang & Saigusa, 2000 c g
 Hemerodromia defessa Williston, 1893
 Hemerodromia deltalutea  g
 Hemerodromia deminuta  g
 Hemerodromia demissa  g
 Hemerodromia denticulata Wagner & Andersen, 1995 c g
 Hemerodromia digitata Grootaert, Yang & Saigusa, 2000 c g
 Hemerodromia dorsalis (Brunetti, 1913) c g
 Hemerodromia dorsata (Melander, 1928) c g
 Hemerodromia dromodromoa Plant & Sinclair, 2008 c g
 Hemerodromia duce Jones, 1940 c g
 Hemerodromia elongata Yang & Yang, 1995 c g
 Hemerodromia elongatiodes Wagner, Leese & Panesar, 2004 c g
 Hemerodromia empiformis (Say, 1823) i c g
 Hemerodromia epandriocurvialis  g
 Hemerodromia epsilutea  g
 Hemerodromia etalutea  g
 Hemerodromia euneura Yang, 1991 c g
 Hemerodromia exhibitor Melander, 1947 i c g
 Hemerodromia fibrina Landry, 1985 i c g
 Hemerodromia flaviventris Yang, 1991 c g
 Hemerodromia flexiformis MacDonald, 1998 c g
 Hemerodromia furcata Grootaert, Yang & Saigusa, 2000 c g
 Hemerodromia fusca Yang & Yang g
 Hemerodromia gaditana Wagner & Cobo, 2001 c g
 Hemerodromia gagneuri Vaillant, 1981 c g
 Hemerodromia gammalutea  g
 Hemerodromia gereckei Wagner, 1995 c g
 Hemerodromia glabella MacDonald, 1998 c g
 Hemerodromia gogi Smith, 1969 c g
 Hemerodromia gonatopus Speiser, 1908 c g
 Hemerodromia goya Jones, 1940 c g
 Hemerodromia guangxiensis Yang, 1991 c g
 Hemerodromia hammanica Vaillant & Moubayed, 1998 c g
 Hemerodromia haruspex Melander, 1947 i c g
 Hemerodromia hermelina Vaillant & Moubayed, 1998 c g
 Hemerodromia icenae Jones, 1940 c g
 Hemerodromia illiesi Joost, 1980 c g
 Hemerodromia iqasoa Plant & Sinclair, 2008 c g
 Hemerodromia isochita  g
 Hemerodromia isserana Vaillant & Gagneur, 1998 c g
 Hemerodromia jauensis  g
 Hemerodromia joosti Wagner, 1984 c g
 Hemerodromia jugulator Melander, 1927 i c g
 Hemerodromia kumia Plant & Sinclair, 2008 c g
 Hemerodromia lamellata  g
 Hemerodromia lativitta Smith, 1969 c g
 Hemerodromia laudatoria Collin, 1927 c g
 Hemerodromia ligata MacDonald, 1998 c g
 Hemerodromia loba MacDonald, 1998 c g
 Hemerodromia lomri Smith, 1965 c g
 Hemerodromia longilamellata  g
 Hemerodromia macrocephala Vaillant & Gagneur, 1998 c g
 Hemerodromia maculata Vaillant, 1968 c g
 Hemerodromia magogi Smith, 1969 c g
 Hemerodromia maia Jones, 1940 c g
 Hemerodromia maturaca  g
 Hemerodromia mazoviensis Niesiolowski, 1987 c g
 Hemerodromia megalamellata  g
 Hemerodromia melangyna Collin, 1927 c g
 Hemerodromia melanosoma Melander, 1947 i c g
 Hemerodromia membranosa  g
 Hemerodromia menghaiensis Yang & Yang, 1988 c g
 Hemerodromia menglunana Grootaert, Yang & Saigusa, 2000 c g
 Hemerodromia moqimoqilia Plant & Sinclair, 2008 c g
 Hemerodromia mourai  g
 Hemerodromia namtokhinpoon  g
 Hemerodromia nigrescens Yang & Yang, 1995 c g
 Hemerodromia nigrolineata Roser, 1840 c g
 Hemerodromia nympha Melander, 1928 c g
 Hemerodromia ocellata  g
 Hemerodromia oratoria Fallen, 1816 c g
 Hemerodromia oriens  g
 Hemerodromia orientalis Meijere, 1911 c g
 Hemerodromia phahompokensis  g
 Hemerodromia pila Smith, 1965 c g
 Hemerodromia portia Jones, 1940 c g
 Hemerodromia puerensis Yang & Yang, 1988 c g
 Hemerodromia radialis Collin, 1928 c g
 Hemerodromia raptoria Meigen, 1830 c g
 Hemerodromia raradamua Plant & Sinclair, 2008 c g
 Hemerodromia reclinata MacDonald, 1998 c g
 Hemerodromia resurrecta Jones, 1940 c g
 Hemerodromia rhomboides Wagner, Leese & Panesar, 2004 c g
 Hemerodromia rogatoris Coquillett, 1895 i c g
 Hemerodromia seguyi  i c g
 Hemerodromia senivaua Plant & Sinclair, 2008 c g
 Hemerodromia serpa Smith, 1965 c g
 Hemerodromia serrata Saigusa & Yang, 2003 c g
 Hemerodromia simplicinervis Melander, 1928 c g
 Hemerodromia sinclairi MacDonald, 1998 c g
 Hemerodromia slovenica Horvat & Wagner, 1990 c g
 Hemerodromia smithi  g
 Hemerodromia songsee  g
 Hemerodromia spectabilis Smith, 1969 c g
 Hemerodromia spiculata Plant & Sinclair, 2008 c g
 Hemerodromia spinosa Vaillant & Gagneur, 1998 c g
 Hemerodromia splendens Smith, 1969 c g
 Hemerodromia stellaris Melander, 1947 i c g
 Hemerodromia striata Yang & Yang, 1988 c g
 Hemerodromia subapicalis Yang, Zhang & Zhang, 2007 c g
 Hemerodromia subchelata MacDonald, 1998 c g
 Hemerodromia subiqasoa Plant & Sinclair, 2008 c g
 Hemerodromia subspinosa Yang, Zhang & Zhang, 2007 c g
 Hemerodromia sufflexa Melander, 1947 i c g
 Hemerodromia superstitiosa Say, 1824 i c g b
 Hemerodromia susana Jones, 1940 c g
 Hemerodromia systoechon  g
 Hemerodromia tarda Jones, 1940 c g
 Hemerodromia tebbarana Vaillant & Gagneur, 1998 c g
 Hemerodromia telloutica Vaillant & Gagneur, 1998 c g
 Hemerodromia tigrigrana Vaillant & Gagneur, 1998 c g
 Hemerodromia todrhana (Vaillant, 1956) c g
 Hemerodromia ubajaraensis  g
 Hemerodromia ultima Jones, 1940 c g
 Hemerodromia unilineata Zetterstedt, 1842 c g
 Hemerodromia ursula Jones, 1940 c g
 Hemerodromia vates Melander, 1947 i c g
 Hemerodromia vittata Loew, 1862 i c g
 Hemerodromia votovotoa Plant & Sinclair, 2008 c g
 Hemerodromia vucea Plant & Sinclair, 2008 c g
 Hemerodromia vulacia Plant & Sinclair, 2008 c g
 Hemerodromia vutivutia Plant & Sinclair, 2008 c g
 Hemerodromia wagneri Cobo & Carreira, 2003 c g
 Hemerodromia watlingi Plant & Sinclair, 2008 c g
 Hemerodromia xanthiocephala Yang, 1991 c g
 Hemerodromia xanthocephala Yang & Yang, 1991 c g
 Hemerodromia xiphias Bezzi, 1914 c g
 Hemerodromia xizangensis Yang, 1991 c g
 Hemerodromia yunnanensis Yang & Yang, 1988 c g
 Hemerodromia zarcana Vaillant & Moubayed, 1998 c g
 Hemerodromia zetalutea  g
 Hemerodromia zwicki Horvat, 1993 c g

Data sources: i = ITIS, c = Catalogue of Life, g = GBIF, b = Bugguide.net

References

Hemerodromia
Articles created by Qbugbot